West Horsley Place is a Grade I listed building in West Horsley, to the east of Guildford in Surrey. There are eight further Grade II buildings on the estate, including two mid-19th-century dog kennels.

History
The house dates back to the 15th century, and is a timber-framed building. The house has 50 rooms. In the sixteenth century, it was owned by John Bourchier, 2nd Baron Berners, who made the first English translation of Froissart's Chronicles, and later by the Earl of Lincoln.

The house, or the additions in the reign of Charles I, is given as a leading example by Sir John Summerson of what he calls "Artisan Mannerism", a development of Jacobean architecture led by a group of mostly London-based craftsmen still active in their guilds (called livery companies in London). It features prominently the fancy, quasi-classical, gable ends that were a mark of the style. Another example, Swakeleys House in west London, shows "what a gulf there was between the taste of the Court and that of the City." Other houses in the style are the Dutch House, the surviving remnant of Kew Palace, and Slyfield Manor, near Guildford.

It was later rented by Henry Currie, the Conservative MP for Guildford, from 1847 to 1852. In 1868, the place was used for fox hunting. When owner Laura Mary Fielder died in 1908, West Horsley Place was valued at £62,536 (equivalent to £ in ).

In 1931, it was acquired by Robert Crewe-Milnes, 1st Marquess of Crewe, and his wife, the Marchioness of Crewe. The Marquess died in 1945 and, on her death in 1967, his widow, Peggy née Primrose, left it to their daughter, Mary Innes-Ker, Duchess of Roxburghe (1915–2014). The Duchess closed much of the house, living in a five-room section.

When the 99-year-old Duchess died in 2014, it was "accidentally" inherited by her (then) 80-year-old grand-nephew, the broadcaster and author Bamber Gascoigne. The Duchess was childless, but had numerous grand-nieces and grand-nephews. Gascoigne had no idea she had picked him to solely inherit the property, first learning of it when he was contacted by a solicitor after his great-aunt's death.

To raise money to restore the somewhat dilapidated 50-room house, Gascoigne arranged for the Duchess's possessions – some found under cobwebs in the closed-up sections of the house – to be auctioned by Sotheby's in London and Geneva. Originally expected to raise £2.2 million, the auction raised £8.8 million, with her Cartier diamond engagement ring selling for £167,000, 14 times its estimate. Gascoigne subsequently transferred ownership of the house and estate to the West Horsley Place Trust. 

The Trust holds regular guided tours and open days of the house and gardens. The grounds are regularly used for events, concerts, art workshops and filming, in addition the main house and converted Place Farm Barn are available for occasional hire. In 2021 the Trust hosted their first wedding ceremony.

In popular culture
The house was the location for much of the filming of the 2015 ITV television film Harry Price: Ghost Hunter, and the 2019 sitcom Ghosts for series 1, 2, 3, and 4, including Christmas specials, under the name Button House. The 2020 film Enola Holmes interior scenes were shot at the house.

Other productions using West Horsley Place as a location include My Cousin Rachel, Mothering Sunday, Cuckoo and The Crown.

Grange Park Opera
Grange Park Opera took up residence in a purpose-built 700-seat theatre in the grounds, with its inaugural production of Puccini's Tosca, led by the Maltese tenor Joseph Calleja on 8 June 2017. The lease on the theatre is for 99 years. The planning application for the Theatre in the Woods met with some opposition, due to it being in the Metropolitan Green Belt, but with the support of the conductor Stephen Barlow and others was approved by Guildford Borough Council in May 2016.

References

External links

 

Grade I listed buildings in Surrey
Grade I listed houses
15th-century architecture